Uncle Sam is the self-titled 1997 debut album from Uncle Sam. It includes the hit single "I Don't Ever Want To See You Again" and the cover "Tender Love". On the worldwide release, a few bonus tracks were included.

Track listing 

1997 debut albums